Erythrops is a genus of marine crustaceans in the family Mysidae.

Species 
There are 17 recognized species:
 Erythrops abyssorum G.O. Sars, 1869
 Erythrops africanus O. Tattersall, 1955
 Erythrops alboranus Bacescu, 1989
 Erythrops bidentatus Nouvel, 1973
 Erythrops elegans (G.O. Sars, 1863)
 Erythrops erythrophthalmus (Goës, 1864)
 Erythrops frontieri Nouvel, 1974
 Erythrops glacialis G.O. Sars, 1885
 Erythrops microps (G.O. Sars, 1864)
 Erythrops minutus Hansen, 1910
 Erythrops nanus W. Tattersall, 1922
 Erythrops neapolitanus Colosi, 1929
 Erythrops parvus Brattegard, 1973
 Erythrops peterdohrni Bacescu & Schiecke, 1974
 Erythrops phuketensis Fukuoka & Murano, 2002
 Erythrops serratus (G.O. Sars, 1863)
 Erythrops yongei W. Tattersall, 1936

References 

Mysida
Malacostraca genera
Taxa named by  Georg Ossian Sars